Bachir Mahamat (born 1 December 1996) is a Chadian sprinter. He competed in the men's 400 metres at the 2016 Summer Olympics and the 2020 Summer Olympics.

International competitions

References

External links

Bachir Mahamat at All-Athletics.com

1996 births
Living people
Chadian male sprinters
Olympic athletes of Chad
Athletes (track and field) at the 2016 Summer Olympics
Place of birth missing (living people)
World Athletics Championships athletes for Chad
People from N'Djamena
Athletes (track and field) at the 2020 Summer Olympics